The National Bloc was a anti-socialist coalition of political parties in Italy formed for the 1921 general election.

History
The National Bloc incorporated the electoral list of the Liberal former Prime Minister Giovanni Giolitti, the Fasci Italiani di Combattimento led by Benito Mussolini, the Italian Nationalist Association led by Enrico Corradini, and other right-wing forces.

The list obtained 19.1% of votes and a total of 105 MPs, including 35 fascists (including Mussolini) and 20 MPs for the Italian Nationalist Association. Almost all of the MPs supported the Mussolini government, which took office 31 October 1922, after the March on Rome. In 1924, the National Bloc was succeeded by Mussolini’s National List.

Composition

Electoral results

References

1921 establishments in Italy
1924 disestablishments in Europe
Anti-communist parties
Banned far-right parties
Fascist parties
Italian Fascism
Political parties disestablished in 1924
Political parties established in 1921
Defunct political parties in Italy